Aaron Kelton (born c. 1970) is an American college football coach. He is the head football coach at Savannah State University in Savannah, Georgia, a position he has held since 2022. Kelton served as the head football coach at Williams College in Williamstown, Massachusetts from 2010 to 2015 and Shorter University in Rome, Georgia from 2016 to 2017. He was also the interim head football coach at Howard University in Washington, D.C. for the final three games of the 2019 season.

Early years
A native of Boston, Kelton attended Wellesley High School, where he played football, baseball, and basketball. He then attended Springfield College, from which he graduated in 1992 with a Bachelor of Science degree in psychology. While there, he earned a varsity letter in football all four years and spent two as the starting quarterback.

Coaching career
From 1992 through 1996, Kelton coached high school football in Massachusetts. His first college football coaching position was in 1997, with MIT. He spent a year each at Clarion and Concord, then was with Virginia State from 2001 through 2005, serving all but his first year there as defensive coordinator.

Kelton served as the secondary coach at Columbia for 2006 and 2007, and was then promoted to defensive coordinator for 2008 and 2009.

Williams
In May 2010, Williams College hired Kelton as head coach of the Ephs football team to replace Mike Whalen, who resigned to return to his alma mater, Wesleyan University. With the hiring, Kelton became the first black varsity head coach at Williams College and the seventh black head football coach at the NCAA Division III level. In 2010, Kelton guided the Ephs to an 8–0 record and the New England Small College Athletic Conference (NESCAC) championship, and became the first Williams College football coach to go undefeated in his debut season. For the performance, he was named the 2010 NESCAC Coach of the Year. Kelton resigned his position after the 2015 season after only going 1–5 against archrival Amherst College.

Shorter
Kelton was head coach of the Shorter Hawks in 2016 and 2017, with the team going winless during those two seasons. He also served as Shorter's interim athletic director during 2017.

Morgan State
Kelton spent the 2018 season as co-defensive coordinator for the Morgan State Bears.

Howard
In July 2019, Kelton joined Howard University as the director of football operations. In November 2019, Kelton became the interim head coach for the Howard Bison when first-year head coach Ron Prince was placed on administrative leave.

Head coaching record

Notes

References

Further reading

External links
 Savannah State profile
 Howard profile
 Morgan State profile
 Shorter profile
 

1970s births
Living people
American football quarterbacks
Clarion Golden Eagles football coaches
Columbia Lions football coaches
Concord Mountain Lions football coaches
Howard Bison football coaches
MIT Engineers football coaches
Morgan State Bears football coaches
Savannah State Tigers football coaches
Shorter Hawks football coaches
Springfield Pride football players
Williams Ephs football coaches
Virginia State Trojans football coaches
High school football coaches in Massachusetts
Virginia State University alumni
People from Wellesley, Massachusetts
Coaches of American football from Massachusetts
Players of American football from Boston
African-American coaches of American football
African-American players of American football
Year of birth missing (living people)
20th-century African-American sportspeople
21st-century African-American sportspeople